Ismail Ragib Khalidi (November 13, 1916 – September 2, 1968) was a senior political affairs officer for the United Nations Department of Political Affairs.

Khalidi was born in Jerusalem, then still part of the Ottoman Syria, on November 13, 1916.<ref name=officialbiography>Official Biography from Constitutional Development in Libya, p. 128]</ref> He was the brother of Husayin al-Khalidi, father of  Rashid Khalidi and the grandfather of the American playwright, Ismail Khalidi (writer).

Khalidi attended St. George's School, Jerusalem and the Arab College (Jerusalem) (1927–1936). In 1939, he received his B.A.in political science from the American University of Beirut. He completed his studies in the United States, receiving an M.A. from the University of Michigan in 1940, and Ph.D. from Columbia University in 1955.

His Ph.D. dissertation for Columbia became the book, Constitutional Development in Libya, published in 1956, with an introduction by Adriaan Pelt. He also credits Charles Issawi and J. C. Hurewitz as having contributed to the creation of the book.J. C. Hurewitz, 93, Dies; Scholar of the Middle East At the time of publication, it was the first study conducted in English on the development of the Constitution of Libya (1951).

Khalidi also served as the assistant editor, Middle East Desk, United States Office of War Information from 1942–44, and the Secretary of the Institute for Arab American Affairs from 1945-48.Hani J. Bawardi, 2014, "The Institute of Arab American Affairs: Arab Americans and the New World Order," in The Making of Arab Americans: From Syrian Nationalism to U.S. Citizenship, pp. 239-295, esp. pp. 246, 249f, 340, Austin, TX: University of Texas Press, see , accessed 18 June 2015. He was an employee at the United Nations for 19 years, joining originally as a radio announcer. He died on September 2, 1968 at the age of 51 in Beirut, Lebanon.

Publications
Constitution of the United Kingdom of Libya: Background and Summary. Middle East Journal, Vol. 6, No. 2 (Spring, 1952), pp. 221–228.
 [http://ismail-raghib-khalidi.blogspot.com/ Constitutional Development in Libya. Beirut: KHAYAT's College Book Collective, 1956.

Further reading
E.A.V. Candole. "Book Review: Constitutional Development in Libya. by Ismail Raghib Khalidi." International Affairs, Vol. 34, No. 2 (Apr., 1958), pp. 246–247.
Lewis, William H. "Book Review: Constitutional Development in Libya by Ismail Raghib Khalidi." Middle East Journal, Vol. 12, No. 1 (Winter, 1958), p. 107.

References

External links
Official Biography from Constitutional Development in Libya, p. 128
Official memorial site (includes full scan of Constitutional Development in Libya'')

1916 births
1968 deaths
Ismail
Palestinian officials of the United Nations
Politics of Libya
Arab people in Mandatory Palestine
Palestinian diplomats
Columbia University alumni
University of Michigan alumni
American University of Beirut alumni
People of the United States Office of War Information
Writers from Jerusalem